The 1995 Connecticut Coyotes season was the first of two seasons for the Connecticut Coyotes. They finished the 1995 Arena Football League season 1–11 and were one of three teams in the National Conference to miss the playoffs.

Regular season

Schedule

Standings

Awards

References

Connecticut Coyotes seasons
1995 Arena Football League season
Connecticut Coyotes Season, 1995